The 2012 Masters of Formula 3 was the 22nd Masters of Formula 3 race held at Circuit Park Zandvoort on 15 July 2012.

Drivers and teams

Notes

Classification

Qualifying

Race

References

Masters of Formula Three
Masters of Formula Three
Masters
Masters of Formula Three